Bjarne Nielsen (born 2 October 1957) is a Danish politician. He is a member of the Venstre political party. From 2010-2017 he was the mayor of Langeland Municipality, and has been in the municipal council since the municipality's creation in 2007. Before that he sat in the municipal council of Sydlangeland Municipality from 1994 and until it was merged with Tranekær Municipality and Rudkøbing Municipality in 2007. He has a military background.

References 

1957 births
Living people
Danish municipal councillors
Mayors of places in Denmark
People from Langeland Municipality
Venstre (Denmark) politicians